Thogur is a small, remote village in the Thanjavur district, situated in close proximity to the ancient Kallanai Dam (often known as the Grand Anicut). The village's famous Jaimini Sama Veda (JSV) Padasalai (school) continues to operate in traditional Gurukula style on the banks of the river Cauvery.

Villages in Thanjavur district